The  is a system of manual kana used as part of Japanese Sign Language (JSL). It is a signary of 45 signs and 4 diacritics representing the phonetic syllables of the Japanese language. Signs are distinguished both in the direction they point, and in whether the palm faces the viewer or the signer. For example, the manual syllables na, ni, ha are all made with the first two fingers of the hand extended straight, but for na the fingers point down, for ni across the body, and for ha toward the viewer. The signs for te and ho are both an open flat hand, but in te the palm faces the viewer, and in ho it faces away.

Although a syllabary rather than an alphabet, manual kana is based on the manual alphabet of American Sign Language. The simple vowels a, i, u, e, o are nearly identical to the ASL vowels, while the ASL consonants k, s, t, n, h, m, y, r, w are used for the corresponding syllables ending in the vowel a in manual kana: ka, sa, ta, na, ha, ma, ya, ra, wa. The sole exception is ta, which was modified because the ASL letter t is an obscene gesture in Japan.

The other 31 manual kana are taken from a variety of sources. The signs for ko, su, tu (tsu), ni, hu (fu), he, ru, re, ro imitate the shapes of the katakana for those syllables. The signs for no, ri, n trace the way those katakana are written, just as j and z do in ASL. The signs hi, mi, yo, mu, shi, ku, ti (chi) are slight modifications of the numerals 1 hito, 3 mi, 4 yo, 6 mu, 7 shichi, 9 ku, 1000 ti. The syllable yu represents the symbol for 'hot water' (yu) displayed at public bath houses. Other symbols are taken from words in Japanese Sign Language, or common gestures used by the hearing in Japan, that represent words starting with that syllable in Japanese: se from JSL "back, spine" (Japanese se); so from "that" (sore); ki from "fox" (kitsune); ke from "fault" (ketten), or perhaps "hair" (ke); te from "hand" (te); to from "together with" (to); nu from "to steal" (nusumu); ne from "roots" (ne); ho from "sail" (ho); me from "eye" (me), mo from "of course" (mochiron).

These signs may be modified to reflect the diacritics used in written kana. All the modifications involve adding an element of motion to the sign. The dakuten or ten ten, which represents voicing, becomes a sideways motion; the handakuten or maru, used for the consonant p, moves upwards, small kana and silent w move inwards, and long vowels move downwards.

That is, the voiced consonants are produced by moving the sign for the syllable with the corresponding unvoiced consonant to the side. (That is, to the right if signing with the right hand.) The manual kana ga, gi, gu, ge, go are derived this way from ka, ki, ku, ke, ko; likewise, those starting with z, d, b are derived from the s, t, h kana. The p kana are derived from the h kana by moving them upwards. The long vowel in kō (indicated in katakana by a long line) is shown by moving the sign ko downward. In written kana, a consonant cluster involving y or w is indicated by writing the second kana smaller than the first; a geminate consonant by writing a small tu for the first segment. In foreign borrowings, vowels may also be written small. In manual kana, this is indicated by drawing the kana that would be written small in writing (the ya, yu, yo, wa, tu, etc.) inwards, toward the body. This motion is also used to derive the kana wi, we, wo (now pronounced i, e, o) from the kana i, e, o.

The Yubimoji

See also 
 Japanese Sign Language

External links

The full Yubimoji list (in Japanese)

References
 

Manual alphabet

ja:指文字